Mighty Med is an American television series created by Jim Bernstein and Andy Schwartz and produced by It's a Laugh Productions for Disney XD. It stars Bradley Steven Perry, Jake Short, Paris Berelc, Devan Leos, and Augie Isaac. The series aired for two seasons, premiering on October 7, 2013, and running through September 9, 2015.

Premise
While at a comic book store called The Domain, which is located in Philadelphia, Pennsylvania, two boys named Kaz and Oliver find themselves in a superhero hospital called Mighty Med upon finding its secret entrance at the local hospital. They become doctors and youth observers at Mighty Med under the supervision of Horace Diaz, despite the fact that they are normos, a term given to ordinary humans. Kaz and Oliver would often work on various injured superheroes while having some misadventures along the way that would involve encounters with various supervillains.

Episodes

Cast

Bradley Steven Perry as Kaz
Jake Short as Oliver
Paris Berelc as Skylar Storm 
Devan Leos as Alan Diaz
Augie Isaac as Gus (recurring season 1, starring season 2)

Production
The series was greenlit in April 2013. It premiered with a one-hour episode on October 7, 2013, aired on Disney Channel on October 12, 2013.

On May 22, 2014, Disney renewed the series for a second season with production to resume in July. The second season started on October 20, 2014, and the completed its run on September 9, 2015.

Broadcast
The series originally premiered on October 7, 2013, on Disney XD and on October 12, 2013, on Disney Channel. It premiered on Disney XD (Canada) on November 2, 2013, on February 17, 2014, on Disney XD (Malaysia), and on February 27, 2014, on Disney XD (UK & Ireland). It premiered on March 7, 2014, on Disney Channel (Southeast Asia), and also on Disney XD (Europe, Middle East and Africa). It premiered on April 11, 2014, on Disney XD (Australia).

Spinoff series
On September 3, 2015, it was announced that Mighty Med would end after its second season and would be followed by a spinoff series called Lab Rats: Elite Force that will also include two characters from Lab Rats. Jake Short, Bradley Steven Perry, and Paris Berelc were the only cast members that were announced as returning for the spinoff series. It was subsequently announced that Lab Rats: Elite Force would premiere on Disney XD on March 2, 2016.

References

External links

2010s American children's comedy television series
2010s American superhero comedy television series
2013 American television series debuts
2015 American television series endings
Disney XD original programming
English-language television shows
Television series by It's a Laugh Productions
Television shows set in Philadelphia